Nicola Cheung Sun Yuet was born on 31 May 1976 in Hong Kong and graduated from Hong Kong University (Bachelor of Laws) in 1997. She is a Hong Kong television and film actress.

Filmography

Television series

Film

Discography
一不小心 (2001)
再不小心 (2001)
Angel of Mercy (2002)

References

1976 births
Living people
TVB veteran actors
Hong Kong people
Alumni of the University of Hong Kong